Moot court is a co-curricular activity at many law schools. Participants take part in simulated court or arbitration proceedings, usually involving drafting memorials or memoranda and participating in oral argument. In most countries, the phrase "moot court" may be shortened to simply "moot" or "mooting". Participants are either referred to as "mooters" or, less conventionally, "mooties".

Format and structure

Moot court involves simulated proceedings before an appellate court, arbitral tribunal, or international dispute resolution body. These are different from mock trials that involve simulated jury trials or bench trials. Moot court does not involve actual testimony by witnesses, cross-examination, or the presentation of evidence, but is focused solely on the application of the law to a common set of evidentiary assumptions, facts, and clarifications/corrections to which the competitors are introduced. Though not moots in the traditional sense, alternative dispute resolution competitions focusing on mediation and negotiation have also branded themselves as moot competitions in recent times, as had role-playing competitions in the past such as the Jean-Pictet.

Moot court, like law review and clinical work, is one of the key extracurricular activities in many law schools around the world. Depending on the competition, students may spend a semester researching and writing the written submissions or memorials, and another semester practicing their oral arguments, or may prepare both within the span of a few weeks. Whereas domestic moot court competitions tend to focus on municipal law such as criminal law or contract law, regional and international moot competitions tend to focus on cross-border subjects such as EU Law, public international law (including its subsets environmental law, space law, and aviation law), international human rights law, international humanitarian law, international criminal law, international trade law, international maritime law, international commercial arbitration, and foreign direct investment arbitration. Ancillary issues pertaining to jurisdiction, standing, choice of law, and remedies are also occasionally engaged, especially in arbitration and international law moots.

In most moot court competitions, there are two sides and each side is represented by two speakers or oralists (though the entire team composition may be larger, and the number of speakers may range from one to four) and a third member, sometimes known as of counsel, may be seated with the speakers. Each speaker usually speaks between 10 and 25 minutes, covering one to three main issues. After the main submissions are completed, there will usually be a short round or two of rebuttal and even surrebuttal. Communications between speakers may or may not be prohibited. Throughout the course of the submissions, judges — usually lawyers, academics, or actual judges — may ask questions, though in some competitions questions are reserved to the end of submissions.

In larger competitions, teams have to participate in up to ten rounds; the knockout/elimination stages are usually preceded by a number of preliminary rounds to determine seeding (power seeding is often used). Teams almost always must switch sides (applicant/appellant/claimant on one side, and respondent on the other) throughout a competition, and, depending on the format of the moot, the moot problem usually remains the same throughout. The scores of the written submissions are taken into consideration for most competitions to determine qualification (whether for the competition or for the knockouts) and seeding, and sometimes even up to a particular knockout stage. Participation in moot court are relevant to some law school rankings.

International moot court competitions
International moot competitions are generally targeted at students (including postgraduates) and only allow participants who have not qualified to practice law in any jurisdiction. However, there are a handful of international moot competitions that are targeted at newly qualified lawyers, such as the ECC-SAL Moot, which is a regional moot started in 2012 and is jointly organised by Essex Court Chambers and the Singapore Academy of Law, and the New South Wales Young Lawyers/CIArb competition.

The table below lists some of the more notable international moot competitions for students. Grand slam international moots refer to class-leading moots or those that attract a substantial number of teams, while smaller or less established and region-only competitions are known as internationals and regionals respectively. Some countries also divide competitions into various tiers of prestige for the purpose of awarding points in league tables, with moots such as the Jessup and Vis competitions being considered as belonging to the highest tier. Most international moots only permit one team per institution; competitions that allow more than one team tend to be smaller in scale, and competitions that allow teams to comprise members from more than one institution are rare. Some competitions also limit the number of teams based on geographical location; for instance, for most countries, the Jessup generally only permits one qualifying institution for every ten law schools.

For the 2019/20 international moots season, many competitions such as the Jessup, Frankfurt, and International Criminal Court were cancelled due to COVID-19. Some competitions, however, such as The European Law Moot Court Competition, Price, Vis, and Vis East, hosted the oral rounds via online platforms such as Zoom and Microsoft Teams. With international travel still largely restricted late into 2020, all major competitions adopted the virtual format for 2020/21 as well, with some modifying the rules regarding qualification procedures and methods of presentation (such as standing versus sitting, sharing devices, and speaking time). By the 2022/23 season, however, almost all competitions had reverted to the in-person format.

List of notable moot court competitions

List of notable mediation and negotiation competitions

Domestic moot court competitions

North America
Some moot court organisations accept a small group of people for membership, and those members each participate in a number of national or regional moot court competitions. Other schools accept a larger number of members, and each member is matched with one competition. A few schools conduct moot court entirely intramurally. Moot court competitions are typically sponsored by organisations with interest in one particular area of law, and the moot court problems address an issue in that field. Competitions are often judged by legal practitioners with expertise in the particular area of law, or sometimes by sitting judges.

The basic structure of a moot court competition roughly parallels what would happen in actual appellate practice. Participants will typically receive a problem ahead of time, which includes the facts of the underlying case, and often an opinion from a lower court that is being challenged in the problem. Students must then research and prepare for that case as if they were lawyers or advocates for one or sometimes both of the parties. Depending on the competition, participants will be required to submit written briefs, participate in oral argument, or both. The case or problem is often one of current interest, sometimes mimicking an actual case, and sometimes fabricated to address difficult legal issues.

Notable competitions include Ames Moot Court Competition and The Laskin Moot. A number of moot court competitions focus on specific areas of law. For example, the First Amendment Center annually holds a National First Amendment Moot Court Competition, in which the judges have included numerous United States Circuit Court judges.

While moot court is most commonly associated with law schools in North America, it is also a popular activity at the collegiate and high school levels. In the United States, the American Moot Court Association is the national governing body for undergraduate moot court. At the high school level, the National Association of Moot Court oversees a circuit of regional and national competitions each year.

United Kingdom
Notable competitions in the UK include the English Speaking Union Moot and London Universities Mooting Shield.

In England and Wales, moots typically simulate proceedings in either the Court of Appeal or the Supreme Court. Moot questions generally involve two questions of law that are under dispute and come with a set of facts about the case that have been decided at the first instance trial. Generally the question will surround a subject that is unclear under the present state of the law and for which no direct precedent exists. It is normal practice for the senior counsel to take on the first point and the junior the second; although this may vary depending upon the exact nature, and necessary length, of the arguments. Typically the question will focus on one area of law, such as tort, contract, criminal law or property law.

In Scotland a moot can be set in a variety of fora; in civil law problems it is set most commonly in either the Inner House of the Court of Session or in the House of Lords, although it is not uncommon for a moot to be heard in the Sheriff Court before the Sheriff or Sheriff Principal. Occasionally, an Employment Appeal Tribunal may also be used as a forum for a Scottish civil law moot. If the moot problem concerns Criminal Law, the moot will most likely be heard as though in the Appellate division of the High Court of Justiciary (commonly known as the Court of Criminal Appeal). Junior counsel is more likely to take the first moot point and senior counsel the second (this can however be reversed depending on the problem). The format of the moot is far more adversarial than that of English and Welsh moots.  This manifests itself in different ways, most notably with the appellants and respondents facing each other during a moot, rather than, as in England and Wales, facing the judge.

See also

 Mock trial
 Model United Nations
 Mootness, which has a precise meaning in United States law that is quite different from United Kingdom usage

References

External links

 The International Moot Court Compendium
 Bar and Bench

Informal legal terminology
Legal education